Marvel Champions: The Card Game is a cooperative, living card game published by Fantasy Flight Games. Players control decks representing heroes from the Marvel Universe, and work together to defeat a villain that is attempting to complete a "Scheme". Players can customize their hero's deck, and the game includes various modular encounters to customize villain scenarios. The core set was originally released in 2019. Expansions to the game are released in the form of hero decks, villain scenarios, or larger campaign boxes that include both hero and villain scenario content.

Gameplay 
Marvel Champions is played over a series of rounds, which consist of all of the players taking turns, followed by the villain. The game is cooperative, meaning that players work as a team toward a shared goal and there is no competition among them. Each player chooses one hero, which is represented by a 40–50 card deck. Each deck includes cards specific to that hero; cards from one of four Aspects: Justice, Leadership, Aggression, and Protection; and "basic" cards. During a player's turn, they can play cards, activate card abilities, use their basic abilities to attack the villain and their minions or reduce the number of threat tokens on a scheme, and switch between their hero and alter-ego forms. Some cards and abilities require players to be in either their hero or alter-ego form to use. Cards are used to activate superpowers, recruit allies, upgrade the hero and their allies, or provide new abilities. Players discard cards from their hand to pay the resource cost of the cards they wish to play.

On their turn, the villain has an activation against each player. If the player is in their hero form, the villain attacks them. If the player is in their alter-ego form, the villain adds threat counters to their main scheme. Players have the option to defend incoming attacks with their hero or allies under their control. Once the villain has activated against each hero, the players are all dealt a card from the encounter deck. Encounter cards may cause the villain to attack players again, advance their scheme, or add minions, enemy upgrades, or side-schemes to the play area.

In the game's standard mode, the villain has two forms which the players must reduce to zero health in order to win. Each form beyond the first is more difficult. The game ends when the players win by reducing the villain's second form to zero health, or the villain wins by knocking all of the players' heroes unconscious or completing the final stage of their scheme.

Between games, players can customize their hero's deck. Each hero comes with cards unique to their deck that must be included. Players then choose from one of four kinds of Aspects, which represent how the hero behaves. The four Aspects in the game are: Justice, Leadership, Aggression, and Protection. Justice cards focus on preventing the villain from advancing their scheme, Leadership cards focus on allies, Aggression cards are damage based, and Protection cards are primarily meant to prevent incoming damage. The game also include basic cards, which can be used in any deck.

Villain scenarios are also customizable and consist of the villain's character card, their main scheme, and an encounter deck which contains a mix of cards unique to that villain, as well as smaller encounter sets that the players choose to add. Players can adjust each villain's difficulty by choosing different encounter sets, using the villain's second and third forms instead of the first and second, using only one of the villain's forms, or dealing themselves extra encounter cards during the encounter phase.

Components 
Marvel Champions is played using player cards, which consist of hero decks, aspect cards, and basic cards; villain cards made up of villain decks, main schemes, encounter sets; status cards used to track when characters have the games various conditions applied to them; various tokens to track damage to minions and allies, villain progress toward completing a scheme, or other resources generated by cards; and dials to track hero and villain health.

Core set heroes and villains 
The Marvel Champions core set includes five heroes: Iron Man, Black Panther, Spider-Man, Captain Marvel, and She-Hulk. The villains included are Rhino, Klaw, and Ultron. It also included several encounter sets to customize villain scenarios, additional basic and Aspect cards to customize hero decks, and enough tokens and dials to support up to four players.

Expansions 
Fantasy Flight releases content expansions for Marvel Champions in three forms: Hero packs that include a prebuilt hero deck, as well as additional Aspect cards; Scenario packs, which include a new villain and encounter sets; and larger campaign expansions that include new heroes, as well as villains and encounter sets.

Hero packs 

 Captain America 
 Hulk
 Venom 
 Black Widow (Natasha Romanova)
 Quick Silver
 Thor
 Gamora
 Star-Lord
 Drax
 Nebula
 Ant-Man
 Wasp
 Doctor Strange
 Ms. Marvel
 Scarlet Witch
 War Machine
 Valkyrie
 Vision
 Nova
 Ironheart
 Spider-Ham
 SP//dr
 Cyclops
 Phoenix

Scenario packs 

 Green Goblin 
 Kang the Conqueror
 Wrecking Crew
 Hood

Campaign boxes 

 The Rise of Red Skull - Includes Hawkeye and Spider-Woman as new playable heroes. Villains included are Crossbones, Absorbing Man, Taskmaster, Arnim Zola, and Red Skull.
 Galaxy's Most Wanted - Includes Rocket Raccoon and Groot as new playable heroes. Villains included are Drang, Collector, Nebula, and Ronan the Accuser.
 The Mad Titan's Shadow - Includes Spectrum and Adam Warlock as new playable heroes. Villains included are Loki, Hela, Ebony Maw, Corvus Glaive, Proxima Midnight, and Thanos.
 Sinister Motives - Includes Spider-Man (Miles Morales) and Ghost-Spider as new playable heroes. Villains included are Sandman, Venom, Mysterio, The Sinister Six, and Venom Goblin.
 Mutant Genesis - Includes Shadowcat and Colossus as new playable heroes. Villains included are Sabretooth, a Sentinel, Master Mold, The Brotherhood of Mutants, and Magneto.

Reception and recognition 
Marvel Champions was Board Game Quest's 2019 Cooperative Game of the Year.

References

External links 
 Official website

Dedicated deck card games
Fantasy Flight Games games
Marvel Entertainment
Cooperative games